Spoluka Point (‘Nos Spoluka’ \'nos spo-'lu-ka\) is the ice-covered point on the southwest side of the entrance to Odrin Bay on Nordenskjöld Coast in Graham Land.  It was formed as a result of the retreat of the glacier featuring Arrol Icefall in the early 21st century.  The feature is named after the settlement of Spoluka in Southern Bulgaria.

Location

British mapping in 1978.

Maps

 British Antarctic Territory.  Scale 1:200000 topographic map.  DOS 610 Series, Sheet W 64 60.  Directorate of Overseas Surveys, Tolworth, UK, 1978.
 Antarctic Digital Database (ADD). Scale 1:250000 topographic map of Antarctica. Scientific Committee on Antarctic Research (SCAR), 1993–2016.

References
 Spoluka Point. SCAR Composite Antarctic Gazetteer.
 Bulgarian Antarctic Gazetteer. Antarctic Place-names Commission. (details in Bulgarian, basic data in English)

Headlands of Graham Land
Nordenskjöld Coast
Bulgaria and the Antarctic